Jean Renaud Adde (born 24 October 1970) is a French equestrian. He competed in the 2008 Summer Olympics.

References

1970 births
Living people
Equestrians at the 2008 Summer Olympics
French male equestrians
Olympic equestrians of France
People from Bourg-la-Reine
Sportspeople from Hauts-de-Seine